The Swiss Family Robinson is an American action and adventure series that was broadcast during the 1975–76 TV season. The two-hour pilot for the series was first shown on April 15, 1975. Based upon the 1812 novel The Swiss Family Robinson, the pilot and its 20 subsequent episodes of the series were produced by Irwin Allen, who had earlier produced a futuristic adaptation of the same novel in the 1965 TV series Lost in Space.

Synopsis
The series starred Martin Milner as Karl Robinson, the survivor of a shipwreck who found himself, his wife and two sons stranded on a volcanic island. In one of her first acting performances, Helen Hunt co-starred as a young girl who was stranded on the island from the same shipwreck and who was taken in by the Robinson family. Befriending the Robinsons was Jeremiah Worth (played by Cameron Mitchell), a sailor who had survived on the island alone for seven years following an earlier shipwreck.

The series was initially scheduled opposite NBC's Wonderful World of Disney and CBS' Three for the Road. In December 1975, CBS replaced Three for the Road with 60 Minutes which soon became a popular Sunday night staple. In addition to the tough competition, The Swiss Family Robinson was preempted several times and showed repeat episodes four times during its short run. The final original episode was telecast on April 4, 1976.

Because the Canadian series of the same name had come first, this was shown in Britain and other international territories as Island of Adventure.

Cast
 Martin Milner as Karl Robinson 
 Pat Delaney as Lotte Robinson 
 Willie Aames as Fred Robinson 
 Eric Olson as Ernie Robinson
 Helen Hunt as Helga Wagner 
 Cameron Mitchell as Jeremiah Worth

Episodes

Production notes
This series was directed by Leslie H. Martinson and Christian I. Nyby II. The second unit director was Stan Jolley. The story editing was done by William Welch, the cinematography was by Fred Jackman, Jr., and the original music was by Richard LaSalle.

References

External links
  
  
 The Irwin Allen News Network's Swiss Family Robinson page
The Swiss Family Robinson at Television Obscurities

1975 American television series debuts
1976 American television series endings
American Broadcasting Company original programming
1970s American drama television series
Period family drama television series
Television series by 20th Century Fox Television
Television shows based on Swiss novels
American television shows based on children's books
English-language television shows
The Swiss Family Robinson
Television series set on fictional islands
Television series by Irwin Allen Television Productions
Television series about families
Television shows set in Kentucky